Adscita statices, the green forester, is a moth of the family Zygaenidae. It is found in Europe, Mongolia and western Russia.

Description
The antennae, head, thorax, legs and abdomen are shiny green (the thorax is occasionally blue green and shimmering). However, the wings may appear rusty-red in the early morning and evening. The wide forewings are less glossy than the body, mostly blue green, sometimes also green to yellow green. The fringes are blackish grey. The hindwings are moderately wide with a slightly truncated rim, They are slightly transparent, blackish grey and lightened basally. The underside of both pairs of wings is grey. The caterpillars are pale yellowish-green with a central dark stripe and fine white hairs dorsally. 
The wings of the green forester contain two types of colored scales, of which one contains pores of different sizes. These pores are able to fill with water, which causes the color of the scales to change from green to rusty-red.

Biology
The moth flies in sunshine from mid-May to early August. The larvae feed on various species of Rumex, such as Rumex acetosa and Rumex acetosella. The eggs are laid on the leaf blade; the larva mines the leaf when it is small, but later moves to the lower parts of the plant and feeds on the leaves. When fully developed it descends to the ground and pupates in a cocoon among the vegetation.

British Isles
This species has become very scarce in Northern Ireland, with recent records from northern County Armagh and western County Fermanagh, and because of its rarity there, it is listed as a Northern Ireland Priority Species.

References

External links

The Forester at UKmoths
Lepiforum.de

Procridinae
Moths of Asia
Moths of Europe
Moths described in 1758
Taxa named by Carl Linnaeus